Tallery Mountain is a summit in West Virginia, in the United States.

Tallery Mountain was so named because it was supposed when wet, the slope is as slick as tallow.

References

Mountains of Summers County, West Virginia
Mountains of West Virginia